Kumhar is a caste or community in India, Nepal and Pakistan. Kumhar have historically been associated with art of pottery.

Etymology 
The Kumhars derive their name from the Sanskrit word Kumbhakar meaning earthen-pot maker. Dravidian languages conform to the same meaning of the term Kumbhakar. The term Bhande, used to designate the Kumhar caste, also means pot. The potters of Amritsar are called Kulal or Kalal, the term used in Yajurveda to denote the potter class.

Mythological origin 

A section of Hindu Kumhars honorifically call themselves Prajapati after Vedic Prajapati, the Lord, who created the universe.

According to a legend prevalent among Kumhars 

There is an opinion that this is because of their traditional creative skills of pottery, they are regarded as Prajapati.

Divisions 

The potters are classified into Hindu and Muslim cultural groups. Among Hindus, inclusion of artisan castes, such as potters, in the Shudra varna is indisputable. They are further divided into two groups-clean caste and unclean caste .

Among the Kumhars are groups such as the Gujrati Kumhar, Kurali ke Kumhar, Lad, Haral and Telangi. They all, bear these names after different cultural linguistic zones or caste groups but are termed as one caste cluster.

Distribution in India

Chamba (Himanchal) 
The Kumhars of Chamba are expert in making pitchers, Surahis, vessels, grain jars, toys for entertainment and earthen lamps. Some of these pots bear paintings and designs also.

Maharashtra (Marathe) 
Kumhars are found in Satara, Sangli, Kolhapur, Sholapur and Pune. Their language is Marathi. They use Devnagari script for communication. There are Kumbhars who do not belong to Maratha clan lives in Maharashtra and have occupation of making idols and pots.

Madhya Pradesh 

Hathretie and Chakretie (or Challakad) Kumhars are found in Madhya Pradesh. Hathretie Kumhars are called so because they traditionally moved the "chak" (potter's wheel) by hands ("hath"). Gola is a common surname among Kumhars in Madhya Pradesh. They are listed among Other Backward Classes in the state.

Rajasthan 
In Rajasthan, Kumhars (Also known as Prajapat) have six sub-groups namely Mathera, Kumavat, Kheteri, Marwara, Timria and Mawalia. In the social hierarchy of Rajasthan, they are placed in the middle of the higher castes and the Harijans. They follow endogamy with clan exogamy.

Odisha and Bengal 
In Bengal Kumhars are one among the ceremonially pure castes. In Odisha they are two types (Odia Kumbhar and Jhadua Kumbhar) who provide vessels for the rice distribution to Jagannath temple. They are belongs to Other Backward Classes in the state of Odisha.

Uttar Pradesh and Bihar 
The Kannuaja Kumhars are considered to be a decent caste in both Bihar and Uttar Pradesh. Although they sometimes use the term Pandit as their Surname. The Magahiya Kumhars are treated little inferior to the Kanaujias and the Turkaha (Gadhere). They belong to other backward classes.

Gujarat 
Kumhars are listed among the Other Backward Classes of Gujarat, where they are listed with the following communities: Prajapati (Gujjar Prajapati, Varia Prajapati, Sorthia Prajapati), Sorathiya Prajapati.

See also 
 Pottery
 Kumal people
 Nizamabad black clay pottery

References 

 
Social groups of Rajasthan
Social groups of Uttar Pradesh
Social groups of Bihar
Social groups of Gujarat
Social groups of Maharashtra
Social groups of Madhya Pradesh
Social groups of Punjab, India
Social groups of Haryana
Indian castes
Indian pottery
Other Backward Classes
Pot-making castes
Social groups of Odisha